Park Tae-min (born January 21, 1986) is a South Korean football player who currently plays for and captains Seongnam FC as primarily a left-back, although he is right-footed and can play right-back.

Club career 

Park was a draft pick for the Suwon Bluewings for the 2007 K-League season. Largely a bit player for Suwon, Park switched to Busan I'Park for 2011, and consequently has established himself as a regular starter for his new club. On 5 January 2012, he left Busan for Incheon United.

References

External links

1986 births
Living people
South Korean footballers
Suwon Samsung Bluewings players
Busan IPark players
Incheon United FC players
Seongnam FC players
K League 1 players
K League 2 players
Yonsei University alumni
Sportspeople from South Jeolla Province
Association football defenders